The Journal of Natural Products is a monthly peer-reviewed scientific journal covering all aspects of research on the chemistry and/or biochemistry of naturally occurring compounds. It is co-published by the American Society of Pharmacognosy and the American Chemical Society. The editor-in-chief is Philip J. Proteau (Oregon State University).

History
The journal was established in 1938 as Lloydia, published by the Lloyd Library and Museum, and obtained its present title in 1979. It has been the official journal of the American Society of Pharmacognosy since 1961. Originally a quarterly publication, it became a bimonthly journal in 1975, and has appeared monthly since 1992. The American Society of Pharmacognosy began to co-publish the journal with the American Chemical Society in 1996. In 2008, the journal was hijacked by a low-quality open access journal using the same title. , this counterfeit journal was still active.

Abstracting and indexing
The journal is abstracted and indexed in:

According to the Journal Citation Reports, the journal has a 2021 impact factor of 4.803.

See also
Jerry L. McLaughlin

References

External links

American Chemical Society academic journals
Biochemistry journals
Publications established in 1938
Monthly journals
English-language journals
Hijacked journals